Mesaite is a very rare mineral with formula CaMn2+5(V2O7)3•12H2O. It is monoclinic (space group P2/n). It is related to fianelite, another manganese-rich  divanadate. Examples of other divanadate minerals are volborthite, engelhauptite, karpenkoite, and martyite.

References

Vanadate minerals
Calcium minerals
Manganese(II) minerals
Monoclinic minerals